Emidio is a given name. Notable people with the name include:

Emidio Campi (born 1943), Swiss historian
Emidio Cavigioli (1925–2015), Italian professional footballer
Emidio De Felice (1918–1993), Italian linguist and lexicographer
Emidio Graca (1931–1992), former Portuguese footballer
Emidio Greco (1938–2012), Italian film director and screenwriter
Emidio Massi (1922–2016), Italian Socialist politician, former President of Marche
Ruggero Luigi Emidio Antici Mattei (1811–1883), Italian Cardinal of the Roman Catholic Church
Emidio Morganti (born 1966), Italian football referee
Emidio Oddi (born 1956), retired Italian professional football player
Emidio Pallotta (1803–1868), Italian painter and architect
Emidio Pesce (born 2002), Italian racing driver
Emidio Rafael (born 1986), retired Portuguese footballer
Emidio Recchioni (1864–1933), Italian anarchist involved in a plot to kill Benito Mussolini
Ricardo Emidio Ramalho da Silva (born 1975), Portuguese retired professional footballer
Emidio Soltysik (1974–2020), American political activist for the Socialist Party USA
Emidio Taliani (1838–1907), Italian Cardinal of the Roman Catholic Church
Flavio Emidio dos Santos Vieira (born 1970), Brazilian goalkeeper

See also
Manoel Emidio, municipality in the state of Piauí in Northeast Brazil
Rancho San Emidio, 17,710-acre Mexican land grant in present-day Kern County, California
SS Emidio, 6912-ton tanker of the Socony-Vacuum Oil Company, the first casualty of Japanese submarine action on California's Pacific Coast
San Emidio Geothermal Plant in Washoe County, Nevada, a geothermal power plant

Italian masculine given names